Topolice  is a village in the administrative district of Gmina Żarnów, within Opoczno County, Łódź Voivodeship, in central Poland.

The village has a population of 310.

References

Villages in Opoczno County
Radom Governorate
Kielce Voivodeship (1919–1939)
Łódź Voivodeship (1919–1939)